An Agreement on the Enforcement of Sentences with the International Criminal Court is a formal agreement whereby a state agrees to carry out a sentence imposed by the Court. Article 103 of the Rome Statute of the International Criminal Court states that a "sentence of imprisonment shall be served in a State designated by the Court from a list of States which have indicated to the Court their willingness to accept sentenced persons." To this end, the Court has concluded Agreements with a number of states that have declared their willingness to accept sentenced persons.

States with an agreement with the Court 
Several states have entered into general agreements to enforce sentences imposed by the Court.

Persons transferred pursuant to an agreement

Ad hoc agreements 
An agreement on the enforcement of sentences can also be ad hoc in nature. Such agreements can be concluded between the Court and a state to enforce the sentence of one convicted individual.

States accepting sentenced persons by declaration and under certain circumstances 
Some states have declared their willingness to accept their own nationals or, in some cases, their residents to serve a sentence imposed by the Court within their territory. Sometimes a state has the additional condition of the sentence not exceeding the maximum time allowed for a sentence under national law. The following states have declared their intentions in declarations made when they ratified the Rome Statute.

References 

International Criminal Court
Treaties of Australia
Treaties of Belgium
Treaties of Denmark
Treaties of Finland
Treaties of Serbia
Treaties of the United Kingdom
Treaties concluded in 2005
Treaties entered into force in 2005
International criminal law treaties